The 1949–50 Iraq FA Baghdad First Division was the second season of the Iraq Central FA League (the top division of football in Baghdad and its neighbouring cities from 1948 to 1973). The competition started on 25 November 1949. Ittihad Muntada Al-Karkh decided not to field a team for the season, and Jihad Al-Karkh (winners of the Second Division in the previous season) also did not enter a team. Al-Haras Al-Malaki won the title for the first time.

League table as at 10 February 1950
The following is the most recent league table published by The Iraq Times newspaper as at 10 February 1950, not the final league table.

Results up to 10 February 1950

References

External links
 Iraqi Football Website

Iraq Central FA League seasons
Iraq
1949 in Iraqi sport
1950 in Iraqi sport